Greg Ellis is an American drummer and percussionist, known for his work in film and world music, living in Los Angeles. He has performed and recorded with artists from almost every continent, including Zakir Hussain, Airto, KODO, Mickey Hart’s Planet Drum, Juno Reactor, Billy Idol, Sonu Nigam, Sussan Deyhim, Hamed Nikpay, Bickram Ghosh, Chiwoniso Maraire, Sugizo and many more.

At the start of his career as a touring and session drummer, Ellis discovered hand percussion after reading Mickey Hart’s  “Drumming At The Edge Of Magic.” He began collecting percussion instruments during his travels around the world as a touring musician. The instruments and music from these cultures sensitized Ellis to a different form of melody and composition than his Western classical background offered. Ellis started composing music around rhythm.

He eventually formed the music duo Vas and signed with Narada/Virgin in 1997. Vas went on to release four successful and critically acclaimed albums as well as a solo CD ‘Kala Rupa.’ His percussion work in Vas drew the attention of some of the top film composers and Ellis is now a featured performer on over 100 film scores.

As a passionate advocate for the healing and therapeutic aspects of organic sound and rhythm, Ellis co-created RhythmPharm, a space to receive organic rhythm and sound therapy. Through RhythmPharm, he released the 7-CD box set of ‘Rhythm Tonics,’ which are used by both alternative and mainstream health practitioners worldwide. RhythmPharm is also a platform for Ellis to express his deepening concern of the adverse effects electronic rhythm is having on culture and society as a whole.

Greg was recently spotted in Pune, Maharashtra, India. During Ganesh festival, he was seen playing the drums on streets along with a group of local drum players.

Film works
 Kingdom Come (2001) Fox Searchlight 
 What’s The Worst That Could Happen? (2001) MGM 
 City Of Ghosts (2003) MGM 
 The Matrix: Reloaded (2003) Warner Bros. 
 The Matrix: Revolutions (2003) Warner Bros. 
 Dawn Of The Dead (2004) Universal Pictures 
 The Devil’s Rejects (2005) Lions Gate 
 The Dukes Of Hazard (2005) Warner Bros. 
 Slither (2006) Universal Pictures 
 300 (2007) Warner Bros. Pictures 
 Iron Man (2008) Paramount 
 Body Of Lies (2008) De Line Pictures 
 The Day The Earth Stood Still (2008) 3 Arts Entertainment 
 The Unborn (2009) Rogue Pictures 
 Rise Of The Lycans (2009) Lakeshore Entertainment
 Watchmen (2009) Warner Bros. Pictures 
 The Way (2010) Icon Productions 
 Sucker Punch (2011) Warner Bros. Pictures 
 Argo (2012) Warner Bros. 
 Enough Said (2013) Fox Searchlight Pictures 
 Age Of Extinction (2014) Paramount
 Godzilla (2014) Warner Bros. 
 Money Monster (2016) TriStar
 Daddy's Home 2 (2017) Paramount
 Downsizing (2017) Paramount

Television and commercials
 Salem (WGN)
 Samurai Jack (Cartoon Network)
 Manhunt: The Search for the Unabomber (Discovery Channel)
 NBC
 The Winter Olympics
 Facebook
 Procter & Gamble
 Lee Jeans Co.
 A&E
 TLC
 Bravo
 PBS
 Discovery Channel
 History Channel
 HBO
 BBC

References

External links 
 RhythmPharm website

Year of birth missing (living people)
Living people
American drummers
World music percussionists
Music therapists
Narada Productions artists
Juno Reactor members
American world music musicians